The Residence of the Estonian President, known officially as the Kadriorg Administrative Building, and since 1992 sometimes colloquially as the "president's palace", is a Baroque Revival building located in the Kadriorg park, Tallinn, capital city of Estonia. The building serves as the official residence of the President of Estonia.

History 
The building was designed by Alar Kotli and completed in 1938. The first president of the country to reside in the palace was Lennart Meri.
Echoing the Petrine Baroque style of the neighbouring Kadriorg Palace, then the official residence of the Estonian president, it was purpose-built in 1938 to house offices and living apartments to officials. It is not open to the public.

References 

Buildings and structures in Tallinn
Houses completed in 1937
Palaces in Estonia
Tourist attractions in Tallinn